The Yorkshire Subterranean Society is a caving club based at Helwith Bridge near Horton in Ribblesdale in the Yorkshire Dales. The Yorkshire Subterranean Society is more commonly known as the YSS. The YSS organises regular Caving and Walking meets to the Yorkshire Dales twice a month and other UK Caving areas through the year. The YSS also organises social events and "Try Caving" or potholing weekends for people wishing to have a go at the sport. The YSS also provides single rope technique (SRT) training to its members.

History 
The club was founded in 1964 and celebrated its 40th anniversary in 2004 at the Kings Croft Hotel, Pontefract.

The YSS was formed by a group of enthusiasts in October 1964 initially calling themselves "The Undertakers Subterranean Society". After adverse publicity, they changed their name to the Yorkshire Subterranean Society in August 1965.

Expeditions 

Gouffre Berger 1986
Gouffre Berger 1988
Gouffre Berger 1991
Gouffre Berger 2006
Pierre Saint Martin 2007
Cueto Conventosa 2007
 2008 sees the club plan to visit BU56 otherwise known as Sima de las Puertas de Illamina

See also 

 Caving in the United Kingdom

References

External links 
Yorkshire Subterranean Society
Try caving

Caving organisations in the United Kingdom
Organisations based in North Yorkshire
Organizations established in 1964
1964 establishments in England